Thomas D. Corbin (born January 11, 1965) is an American businessman and politician. He is a member of the South Carolina Senate from the 5th District, serving since 2012, and served for two years prior as a member in the South Carolina House of Representatives from the 17th District. He is a member of the Republican party.

Early life and education
Tom Corbin was born on January 11, 1965, in Greenville, South Carolina to Barbee and Gail McCarty Corbin. He attended Clemson University, graduating in 1987 with a Bachelor of Science in ornamental horticulture.

Political career

Political views
Corbin is a conservative and a member of the Republican Party. As of 2018, he holds a 54% lifetime rating from the American Conservative Union. As is listed on his 2020 campaign website, Corbin is pro-life, and supports gun rights, lowering taxes, and cutting government spending.

Electoral history

2010 South Carolina House of Representatives
Corbin was first elected to the legislature in 2010, when he entered the race for the South Carolina House of Representatives against Republican incumbent Harry Cato, who was seeking an eleventh term. Corbin won the Republican primary and went on to defeat Democrat Stephen Salter in a landslide victory in the general election.

2012 South Carolina House of Representatives
After serving his first term, Corbin decided to run for reelection to the House. He did not face opposition from his own party and advanced automatically to the general election, where he also ran unopposed. After Corbin qualified for the general election, it was announced that incumbent State Sen. Phillip Shoopman would step down, leaving the seat open. As a result, Corbin ran concurrently in both races.

2012 South Carolina Senate
Corbin ran concurrently in this race and the State House race after Phillip Shoopman announced that he would not run for reelection. He defeated Republican opponent Amanda Tieder Somers by nearly a 2-to-1 margin the primary and did not face opposition in the general election. After winning election to the Senate, Corbin resigned his House seat, triggering a special election that was won by Mike Burns.

2016 South Carolina Senate
Corbin ran for reelection to the Senate after the conclusion of his first four-year term. He narrowly defeated Republican challenger John B. White in the primary, winning his party's nomination by only 321 votes. Corbin ran unopposed in the general election.

2020 South Carolina Senate
Corbin, seeking a third term in the Senate, easily defeated Republican challenger Dave Edwards in the primary. He will face opposition in a general election for the first time since his 2010 House race, as Michael McCord qualified for the general election on the Democratic party ticket.

Committees
Corbin formerly served on the State Senate's general and judiciary committees, and currently serves on the finance; fish, game and forestry; labor, commerce and industry; medical affairs; and rules committees, as well as serving on the subcommittee on natural resources and the transportation and regulatory subcommittee.

Controversy 

Corbin has been involved in controversy regarding comments he has made about women. In 2015, in a comment directed at South Carolina Sen. Katrina Shealy, the lone female senator at the time, Corbin said, "Well, you know God created man first. Then he took the rib out of man to make woman. And you know, a rib is a lesser cut of meat." Corbin later apologized, claiming that the comment was made "in jest", and additionally said that Shealy "chose to be offended and make a big deal out of all this". Shealy, in addition to accepting Corbin's apology, later responded that "whether the person speaking them thinks they are in jest or not, these words are hurtful and disrespectful." In addition, Corbin has allegedly remarked that women "do not belong in the South Carolina General Assembly", but rather "at home baking cookies" or "barefoot and pregnant".

Personal life
Corbin is married to Leann Robertson, with whom he has two children. The family currently resides in Travelers Rest. Corbin is a Baptist, and serves as a deacon and Sunday school teacher at Clearview Baptist Church. He has served as vice president and president of the Burban Creek Plantation, a hunting reserve located in Taylors, South Carolina.

References

1965 births
Living people
Democratic Party South Carolina state senators
21st-century American politicians
Clemson University alumni
Politicians from Greenville, South Carolina
People from Travelers Rest, South Carolina